Kathleen "Kitty" McKane Godfree (née McKane; 7 May 1896 – 19 June 1992) was a British tennis and badminton player and the second most decorated female British Olympian, joint with Katherine Grainger

According to A. Wallis Myers of The Daily Telegraph and the Daily Mail, Godfree was ranked in the world top 10 from 1921 (when the rankings began) through 1927, reaching a career high of world No. 2 in these rankings in 1923, 1924, and 1926.

Godfree won five Olympic medals in tennis at the 1920 Antwerp and 1924 Paris games, the most Olympic medals won by a tennis player until Venus Williams matched this record at the 2016 Olympic Games. In 1923, she captured the title at the World Covered Court Championships.

Godfree won the Wimbledon singles title twice. In the 1924 final, Godfree recovered from a set and 4–1 (40–15) down against Helen Wills to win the title. This was the only defeat at Wimbledon for Wills who later won eight titles. In the 1926 final, Godfree recovered from a 3–1 and game-point-against deficit in the third set to defeat Lili de Alvarez.

The 1924 Wimbledon final was not Godfree's only victory over Wills. Godfree also defeated Wills during the 1924 Wightman Cup 6–2, 6–2. On at least two other occasions, Godfree pushed Wills to the limit. Wills won their quarterfinal in the 1923 U.S. Championships 2–6, 6–2, 7–5 after Godfree recovered to 5–5 in the third set after trailing 5–2. In the final of the 1925 U.S. Championships, Wills won in three sets.

In 1925, Godfree became the first person to have reached the singles finals of the French Championships, Wimbledon, and U.S. Championships during her career.

In 1922, Kitty and her sister Margaret McKane Stocks were the only sisters to contest a Wimbledon doubles final (until Serena and Venus Williams reached the final in 2000), losing to Suzanne Lenglen and Elizabeth Ryan 6–0, 6–4.

Godfree's lifetime record at Wimbledon was 38–11 in singles, 33–12 in women's doubles, and 40–12 in mixed doubles.

Godfree received a Centenary medallion on Wimbledon's Centre Court in 1977. She presented the winner's trophy to Martina Navratilova in 1986, in honour of the centenary year of play at Wimbledon. Godfree was inducted into the International Tennis Hall of Fame in 1978.

In badminton, Godfree won eight All England Open Badminton Championships from 1920 through 1925, considered the unofficial World Badminton Championships until 1977.

She was the subject of This Is Your Life in 1987 when she was surprised by Eamonn Andrews while shopping in a supermarket in East Sheen.

Godfree died on 19 June 1992 at the age of 96.

Grand Slam finals

Singles: 5 (2 titles, 3 runners-up)

Doubles: 7 (2 titles, 5 runners-up)

Mixed doubles: 5 (3 titles, 2 runners-up)

Grand Slam singles tournament timeline 

1Through 1923, the French Championships were open only to French nationals and foreigners who had membership with a French tennis club.  The World Hard Court Championships (WHCC), actually played on clay in Paris or Brussels, began in 1912 and were open to all nationalities.  The results from that tournament are shown here from 1920 through 1923.  The Olympics replaced the WHCC in 1924, as the Olympics were held in Paris.  Beginning in 1925, the French Championships were open to all nationalities, with the results shown here beginning with that year.

Husband 
Kitty and her husband Leslie remain the only married couple to have won the mixed doubles championship at Wimbledon, winning the title in 1926. Kitty has also been referred to as Mrs. L. A. Godfree on sportscards and in reference material.

See also 
 Performance timelines for all female tennis players who reached at least one Grand Slam final

References

External links

 
 
 
 

1896 births
1992 deaths
English female badminton players
English Olympic medallists
People educated at St Paul's Girls' School
Olympic bronze medallists for Great Britain
Olympic gold medallists for Great Britain
Olympic silver medallists for Great Britain
Olympic tennis players of Great Britain
People from Westminster
People educated at St Leonards School
International Tennis Hall of Fame inductees
Tennis players at the 1920 Summer Olympics
Tennis players at the 1924 Summer Olympics
Wimbledon champions (pre-Open Era)
Olympic medalists in tennis
English female tennis players
Grand Slam (tennis) champions in women's singles
Grand Slam (tennis) champions in mixed doubles
Medalists at the 1920 Summer Olympics
Medalists at the 1924 Summer Olympics
Tennis people from Greater London
British female tennis players
Grand Slam (tennis) champions in women's doubles